KGLK (107.5 FM, "The Eagle @ 106.9 & 107.5") is a classic rock-formatted radio station licensed to Lake Jackson, Texas, and simulcast on KHPT in Conroe. The facility is owned by Cox Media Group, and is part of a four station cluster that also includes KTHT and KKBQ, in the surveyed Houston metropolitan area. "The Eagle" is headquartered in Suite 2300 at 1990 Post Oak Blvd in the Uptown district of Houston. KGLK's main transmitter facilities are located near Liverpool, Texas, with a backup transmitter site co-located at the KKBQ backup site.

Between KGLK and KHPT, "The Eagle" covers more square miles than any station in southeast Texas.

History
Originally KGOL, the station began broadcasting to the Lake Jackson area at 107.3 FM as a Gospel station in the early 1980s.

Move to 107.5; Z 107 debuts
The station moved north to include service to Houston and signed on at 107.5 FM on August 5, 1986, as classic rock-formatted KZFX "Z107". Z 107 competed primarily with KSRR and KLOL, having won the battle against KSRR who flipped to Top 40 (CHR), yet losing the rock war to KLOL, having been outlasted by it for another decade.

Rocket 107.5/The Buzz
On October 31, 1994, at 11 a.m., the station flipped to alternative rock as KRQT, "Rocket 107.5". Under direction of new General Manager Pat Fant (formerly of KLOL), the station re-launched the format in late May 1995 under the new callsign KTBZ and "107.5 The Buzz" moniker.

The Buzz relocates; Cox acquisition
Due to the 2000 merger of Clear Channel Communications and AMFM, Inc., and the need to stay within the FCC's station ownership cap, Cox Radio acquired the intellectual property of "Oldies 94.5 KLDE", as well as 107.5 FM and simulcast partner 97.1 FM, but did not include the intellectual properties of "The Buzz". Shortly after that, KTBZ announced that "The Buzz" would cease operations at 107.5 on July 18 and began a "Save the Buzz" campaign, sending Buzz listeners into a frenzy for information on the station's "impending demise".

When the actual purpose of the campaign was discovered, an online forum maintained by KTBZ was shut down in order to try to keep the word from getting out as listeners began to post their findings. Still, this did not prevent listeners from distributing banners throughout Houston and painting "Save The Buzz" on their car windows. KTBZ staged a public rally, at which a representative from parent company Clear Channel Radio came to read a statement. The statement read, in part, that in response to public comments, The Buzz would be saved and moved to 94.5 FM, a much stronger signal, resulting in a "Bigger, Better Buzz".

Oldies 107.5
Just before 8:00 p.m. on July 18, 2000, KTBZ and KLDE each played a pre-recorded lead-in to the station switch. KTBZ led a one-minute countdown as they "faded" off of the 107.5 frequency, while KLDE had their air staff riding in a transporter across the dial to 107.5 FM. At exactly 8:00 p.m., the stations simultaneously exchanged frequencies. KTBZ's montage led in with "Turn on the Juice!", while KLDE's air staff "crash-landed" on 107.5. Both stations celebrated the move with their own "Switch Parties"; The Buzz presented a free concert starring Stone Temple Pilots that was broadcast live from The Aerial Theater in downtown Houston on "94.5 The Buzz", while "Oldies 107.5" marked their transition by playing 48 hours of non-stop music. This officially completed the "trade" in ownership. 97.1 FM continued to simulcast 107.5 FM until November 2000, when it flipped to Rhythmic CHR (it is now a classic country station).

In 2004, afternoon "boss jock" Barry Kaye left the station. The following year, in 2005, KLDE dropped any link to "Oldies" whatsoever, playing a mix of classic Top 40 known as classic hits, under the moniker "Houston's 107.5 KLDE", adopting the slogan "The Greatest Hits of the 60s & 70s." The station was also the first to launch HD digital radio in the Houston market in January 2005, and the HD-2 channel was a mix of pre-1964 oldies.

K-Hits
On July 10, 2006, the station changed branding to "107.5 The New K-Hits, Houston's home for the Greatest Hits of the 60's and 70's". While it did not flip formats or fire all the DJs, it did fire the morning team, to be replaced by longtime KRBE APD/afternoon DJ Scott Sparks. The KLDE calls remained in place until December 14, 2006, when the station changed its call letters to KHTC.

The Eagle

On January 27, 2009, the station announced the addition of Dean and Rog from KKRW effective June 1, 2009. Following this announcement, on May 17, 2009, the station changed its call letters, initially without explanation, to KGLK. On June 1, 2009, the station changed its branding to "107.5 The Eagle", and adopted a Classic Rock-leaning approach, but officially remained a Classic Hits station.

106.9 simulcast begins
In June 2011, after years of low ratings, Cox announced that sister station KHPT would begin simulcasting KGLK's programming effective June 20. KHPT previously ran an Alternative format branded as "The Zone", which, in turn, was a replacement for the previous all-'80s hits format known as "The Point".

When KKRW changed its format to urban on December 31, 2013, KGLK, in response, officially reclaimed itself as a Classic Rock station later that day and changed its slogan to "Houston's Only Classic Rock."

FM translator

K291CE (106.1 FM, Hum FM Radio) is a South Asian format that is broadcast on KGLK-HD3 and a 190 watt relay translator at 106.1. K291CE is owned by Primera Iglesia Evangelica de Apostoles y Profetas—a Hispanic church—and leased to Hum Tum Radio, who also leases out KGLK HD-3. Hum Tum Radio/Hum FM is owned by Rehan Siddiqi, a South Asian concert promoter who previously ran the format on several brokered AM stations in Houston, San Antonio, and Dallas. The 106.1 signal is strong in Southwest Houston, Sugar Land, and Missouri City, areas with a large and growing South Asian population.

Former jocks
Former on-air personalities on KGLK include Susie "Carr" Loucks, Paul Christy, Ted Carson,  Joe Ford, Barry Kaye, Michael "Vee" Valdez, Joe Martelle, Linda Cruz, Eddie Cruz, Mike McCarthy, Kevin Charles, Janice Dean, RC Rogers, J.D.Houston, Sheree Bernardi, Sean O'Neel, Col. St. James, Jerry Pelletier, Mark Megason, Bill Campbell, Dave E. Crockett, Ron Parker, Jackie Robbins, Kenny Miles, Ron Leonard, Bob Ford, Donna McKenzie, Chuck Contreras, The Catfish, Blake Lawrence, Sheri Evans, Ken Sasso, Bob Edwards and Suzi Hanks.

Callsign and moniker history
KGOL - November 10, 1980 (Christian "107 KGOL")
KZFX - August 5, 1986 (Z107)
KRQT - October 31, 1994 (Rocket 107.5)
KTBZ - May 12, 1995 (107.5 The Buzz)
KLDE - July 18, 2000 (Oldies 107.5, Houston's 107.5 KLDE)
KHTC - December 14, 2006 (107.5 The New K-Hits)
KGLK - May 17, 2009 (The Eagle - Houston's Classic Hits Station)
KGLK - December 31, 2013 (The Eagle - Houston's Only Classic Rock Station)

Previous logo

References

Radio duo Dean and Rog are leaving 93.7 FM
KLDE Launches HD Radio

External links

GLK
Classic rock radio stations in the United States
Brazoria County, Texas
Cox Media Group
Radio stations established in 1982
1982 establishments in Texas